The 1905–06 Drexel Blue and Gold men's basketball team represented Drexel Institute of Art, Science and Industry during the 1905–06 men's basketball season. The Blue and Gold, led by first year head coach Walter S. Brokaw, who graduated from Drexel in 1905, played their home games at Main Building.

Roster

Schedule

|-
!colspan=9 style="background:#F8B800; color:#002663;"| Regular season
|-

References

Drexel Dragons men's basketball seasons
Drexel
1905 in sports in Connecticut
1906 in sports in Connecticut